Andrew E. Svenson (May 8, 1910 – August 21, 1975) was an American children's author, publisher, and partner in the Stratemeyer Syndicate. Under a variety of pseudonyms, many shared with other authors, Svenson authored or coauthored more than 70 books for children, including books for the Hardy Boys, Bobbsey Twins, Tom Swift, and Honey Bunch series. He wrote the series The Happy Hollisters using the pseudonym Jerry West and The Tolliver Family as Alan Stone.

Early life
Svenson was born in Belleville, New Jersey, in 1910 to parents Sven Andrew Svenson and Laura (Soleau) Svenson.  He was the oldest of three children.  Younger brother Arthur grew up to become a professor of business management at New York University, and younger sister Marjorie became a Registered Nurse.

The family moved to Newark, New Jersey, where Svenson attended Barringer High School. He was athletic, and competed as a sprinter in high school, and later in college.

College
Svenson began to study Engineering at Carnegie Institute of Technology (now Carnegie Mellon University), before realizing that mathematics was not his forte. He transferred to  the University of Pittsburgh, where he focused on his writing, and graduated in 1932.

After his first year of college, he embarked on a cross country adventure with his younger brother Arthur. The two purchased an ancient car (said to be a Model T), which carried them from New Jersey to Montana, before the wheels literally fell off. The two brothers hitch-hiked to Seattle, where they boarded a tramp steamer headed back to the East Coast, via the Panama Canal.  They stopped in Cuba before finally arriving home. Some have suggested that this trip inspired future Hardy Boys books.

Marriage
Svenson met his wife while attending college.  Marian Stewart was the adopted daughter of wealthy parents; they did not approve of her marriage to "the son of a plumber", so the young couple eloped in 1932. She was disowned by her parents for six months, and they refused to pay for her last year of college. The young couple struggled to survive during the depression, but ultimately had a long, happy, successful marriage.  They had six children. Laura, Andrew Jr., Jane, Eric, Eileen, and Ingrid

Early career
Svenson began his career as a copy boy at the Newark Evening News, where he stayed until 1948. He worked his way up at the newspaper, becoming a writer. He was given his own column about pet care and health. During World War II he was promoted to the War Desk, and was the overnight editor for the Sunday Edition of the Newark Evening News. At the News, Svenson became a very close friend of writer Howard R. Garis, author of the Uncle Wiggily children's book series.

Stratemeyer Syndicate
Garis introduced Svenson to Stratemeyer Syndicate partner Harriet Adams in 1947. Svenson began at the Syndicate as a ghostwriter in 1948. By his death in 1975, he had become a full partner in the Syndicate, and had shaped the course of multiple children's book series during three challenging decades.

Svenson began by writing Hardy Boys volumes #’s 28, 29, and 30, based on outlines by Harriet Adams.  His first Hardy Boys book was “The Sign of the Crooked Arrow," published in 1949.  He quickly advanced to work on other series, and on all aspects of production — providing plot outlines, writing complete manuscripts, editing, and rewriting works produced by other Syndicate authors.  By 1961, Svenson had become such a key component to the ongoing success of the Syndicate, that he was made a full partner.

In addition to The Hardy Boys, Svenson wrote 20 volumes of The Bobbsey Twins, as well as volumes for Honey Bunch and Norman.

Svenson originated and wrote three children's book series, The Happy Hollisters, The Tolliver Family, and Brett King. The Tolliver Family was the first series about African-American children. The Happy Hollisters series was based on Svenson's own family. After his death the Stratemeyer Syndicate assigned the rights to The Happy Hollisters to his widow, Marian Svenson. Following her death the series was owned by The Hollister Family Properties Trust.

Hardy Boys
Svenson's best known contribution to children's literature is the Hardy Boys series. The series was originally started by Harriet Adams’ father in 1927, and was written by several ghostwriters until 1948. The early books written in the 1920s and 1930s reflected the social era in which they were created; by today's standards, they have many racial stereotypes. The books also portrayed police officers in a less than flattering light, and the brothers themselves were somewhat rebellious against authority.

The Hardy Boys began to evolve in the late 1940s. Adams chose Svenson for this series based on his family life, and his contributions to the community; she wanted an author who could create more modern, wholesome Hardy Boys. Previously rebellious, the Hardy Boys would be adventurous yet respectful, resourceful and accomplished.  This new image reflected the change in image Americans had of themselves in that era.

The Hardy Boys evolved again, beginning in 1959.  Many readers had complained about racial stereotypes in the older volumes, and under pressure from the publishing company, Harriet Adams agreed to a massive re-writing project to update the series.  Svenson oversaw the  project, eventually re-writing some of his own early books.  The new books were shorter,  free of negative racial stereotypes, and included more action and exotic locations.  Svenson continued his mission to engage children with exciting stories, while simultaneously teaching them.  He intentionally used vocabulary that was above the reading level of his target audience, in order to encourage them to look words up in the dictionary.  He also traveled to the exotic locations he described in his books, in order to authentically portray cultures outside of the United States.  He continued to write Hardy Boys books until his death in 1975.  One of his last changes to the series was a change on the back cover of the books.  On the advice of his granddaughter Jennifer, he changed the wording on the back cover of the Hardy Boys from  “All boys…” to “Anyone."  Some critics have complained about the changes to the series; others have lauded his removal of sexist and racist language, and his willingness to keep the books updated and modern.

The Happy Hollisters

This series, developed and almost entirely written by Andrew Svenson, recounts the adventures of a young American middle-class family solving mysteries from their home on Pine Lake in Shoreham.  This series is unique in that the characters are based on Svenson's family.
In the series, "Pete" represented real son Andrew Jr., "Pam" represented daughter Laura, "Ricky" represented Eric, "Holly" represented Jane, and "Sue" was a composite of Svenson's two youngest daughters, Eileen and Ingrid.  Even the dog and cat had real counterparts; "White Nose" was really the family cat Four Paws in the Snow, and collie "Zip" was real border collie Lassie.

The "villain" Joey Brill, a neighborhood bully who tries to foil the Hollisters' mystery-solving efforts, was based on a real person as well, although everyone claims to have forgotten his real name.

Jane (Svenson) Kossmann recounts that her father placed other real characters in this series, including her social studies teacher Mrs. Farber.  She also relates that some of the stories in the books were based on stories from her Girl Scout Camp and her brother's Boy Scout Camp escapades.  Svenson had his children, and later his grandchildren, review and "edit" his books.  Jane remembers getting to the end of a chapter in an early rough draft of one book, when realized she could not read on, since the book was unfinished.  After begging her father to tell her how the book ended, she was irritated by his response - that he didn't know how it ended yet, since he hadn't written it yet!

Jane also recalls that while her friends at school knew that The Happy Hollisters were based on her family, no one thought it was "any kind of a big deal. It was just another job to them — although they thought it was strange that my father worked from home sometimes, and sometimes all night and weekend."  She reports that he tended to write in concentrated sessions, sometimes for what seemed like three days straight.  When he "locked himself in his office to write," no one was allowed to disturb him.  She reports that he took breaks from writing to swim at the local YMCA, ride his racing bicycle, or punch a boxer's punching bag he had set up at home.

Death
A resident of West Caldwell, New Jersey, Svenson died of prostate cancer at Saint Barnabas Medical Center (Livingston, New Jersey) in 1975. He was 65 years old.

References

Sources
 http://www.TheHappyHollisters.com
 https://web.archive.org/web/20191104074639/http://www.keeline.com/Hardy_Boys.pdf,
 “Girl Sleuth: Nancy Drew and The Women Who Created Her” by Melanie Rehak.
 Interview with Jane (Svenson) Kossmann, June 24, 2009.
 http://www.lib.usm.edu/legacy/degrum/public_html/html/research/findaids/DG0959f.html (Andrew Svenson papers at the University of Southern Mississippi
 https://web.archive.org/web/20090118022928/http://happy-hollisters.com/memoriesofandrew.html (Happy Hollisters.com)
 http://www.fantasticfiction.co.uk/s/andrew-e-svenson/
 https://web.archive.org/web/20091025064209/http://www.win.net/bayport/canon.html
 https://web.archive.org/web/20150413025234/http://stratemeyer.org/BobbseyWriters.html
 http://www.bbc.co.uk/dna/h2g2/A1038791

External links

 Andrew E Svenson Papers at the de Grummond Children's Literature Collection, University of Southern Mississippi – manuscript materials relating to books published under the names Franklin W. Dixon, Jerry West, Alan Stone, and Victor Appleton III
  (previous page of browse report under 'West, Jerry' without '1910–1975')
 WorldCat title search: Hollisters; Tollivers; Bret King

1910 births
1975 deaths
American children's writers
American mystery writers
Barringer High School alumni
Stratemeyer Syndicate
University of Pittsburgh alumni
American newspaper reporters and correspondents
People from Belleville, New Jersey
People from West Caldwell, New Jersey
Writers from Newark, New Jersey
Deaths from prostate cancer
20th-century American novelists
American male novelists
Novelists from New Jersey
American male non-fiction writers
20th-century American male writers
20th-century pseudonymous writers